Federico Alonso may refer to:

 Federico Alonso (sailor) (born 1981), Spanish sailor
 Federico Alonso (footballer) (born 1991), Uruguayan footballer